Beni Popaul Kiendé Lendoye (born 4 May 1986) is a Gabonese international football midfielder playing with Missile FC Libreville.

Career
Kiendé was playing with AS Mangasport in Gabon where he won one national championship before moving to the Republic of Macedonia in December 2008 and signing with Macedonian First League club FK Makedonija Gjorče Petrov. In Makedonia GP he played alongside his national team teammate Georges Ambourouet. He left Macedonia at the end of the 2009–10 season returning to Gabon where he played with AS Pélican until January 2011 when he moved to another Gabon Championnat National D1 club, Missile FC.

National team
He is part of the Gabonese national team since 2007 having played 2 matches that year. More recently, he has been part of the Gabonese team represented at the 2011 African Nations Championship having played in one group match against Algeria and with a subsequent elimination of Gabon in the group stage.

International goals
Scores and results list Gabon's goal tally first.

References

External sources
 

1986 births
Living people
Gabonese footballers
Gabon international footballers
Gabonese expatriate footballers
2011 African Nations Championship players
Association football midfielders
AS Mangasport players
FK Makedonija Gjorče Petrov players
Expatriate footballers in North Macedonia
AS Pélican players
21st-century Gabonese people
Gabon A' international footballers
Gabonese expatriate sportspeople in North Macedonia